Matthew Fisher may refer to:

 Matthew Fisher (English cricketer) (born 1997), English cricketer
 Matthew Fisher (New Zealand cricketer) (born 1999), New Zealand cricketer
 Matthew Fisher (musician) (born 1946), English musician, songwriter and producer
 Matthew P. A. Fisher (born 1960), American theoretical physicist